Daniel Johannes Maartens (born ) is a South African rugby union player for the  in the Pro14, the  in the Currie Cup and the  in the Rugby Challenge. He regularly plays as a flank.

References

South African rugby union players
Living people
1995 births
People from Mbombela
Rugby union flankers
Cheetahs (rugby union) players
Free State Cheetahs players
Pumas (Currie Cup) players
Rugby union players from Mpumalanga